Island Gardens is a Docklands Light Railway (DLR) station next to Island Gardens on the Isle of Dogs, East London. It is just north of the River Thames and is close to the southern tip of the Isle of Dogs and the River Thames.

Island Gardens is a public park with a notable view across the river to the classical buildings of the former Greenwich Hospital and the National Maritime Museum, with Greenwich Park forming a backdrop. The northern entrance of the Greenwich foot tunnel is within the park.

Development

The original Island Gardens DLR station was opened on 31 August 1987 as the southern terminus of the initial system. It was built adjacent to the site of the old North Greenwich railway station, which had been the southern terminus of the former Millwall Extension Railway. It was elevated with two platforms, each capable of accommodating a single car train. The station required significant rebuilding to allow the platforms to take two-car trains. 

The extension to Lewisham passes under the River Thames in a deep tube tunnel. This required a new station to be built slightly further away from the river, north of Manchester Road, and underground. The original station and the southern end of the connecting viaduct have since been demolished.

Pre-opening incident
On 10 March 1987, before the system opened, a test train crashed through buffer stops at the original high-level  terminus and was left hanging from the end of the elevated track. The accident was caused by unauthorised tests being run before the correct installation of the wayside safety system had been verified; an omission in the wayside system allowed the train to travel too fast on the approach to the terminus. The train was being driven manually at the time.

Connections

London Buses routes 135, the D prefix route D7 and night route N550 serve the station.

Services

References

External links

 Docklands Light Railway website – Island Gardens station page

Docklands Light Railway stations in the London Borough of Tower Hamlets
Railway stations in Great Britain opened in 1987
Railway stations located underground in the United Kingdom
Millwall